Frenolicin B is an antibiotic and antitumor agent with the molecular formula C18H16O6 which is produced by the bacterium Streptomyces roseofulvus. Frenolicin B is a selective inhibitor of glutaredoxin 3 and peroxiredoxin 1.

References

Further reading 

 
 
 

Frenolicin B
Oxygen heterocycles
Heterocyclic compounds with 4 rings